Chase Ellison (born September 22, 1993) is an American actor. He is best known for his roles in Mysterious Skin, Tooth Fairy, and The Boy Who Cried Werewolf.

Life and career
Ellison was born in Reno, Nevada to Gary and Cindy Ellison and has two older siblings. He began his acting career at the age of six, working in commercials and modeling for several print campaigns.  He segued into television, landing a guest star role on Family Law, then on Boomtown, Malcolm in the Middle, 7th Heaven, Providence, The Division.  He played a supporting role in George Bamber's The Mostly Unfabulous Social Life of Ethan Green, which then led to a major supporting role in Gregg Araki's Mysterious Skin, a guest role in an episode of Six Feet Under, and a semi regular role as Noah Newman, the son of Nicholas Newman (Joshua Morrow) and Sharon Newman (Sharon Case) on soap opera The Young and the Restless in 2005.

His role in Mysterious Skin (2004) was as the 8-year-old version of the character played by Joseph Gordon-Levitt, one of the film's leads.  In this film, he plays one of two boys who are groomed into a sexual relationship by a Little League baseball coach. However, the film was shot in such a way that the young actors were kept unaware of what they were reacting to.

Ellison has a supporting role in the 2010 film Tooth Fairy as the teenage son of Ashley Judd's character, the girlfriend of the titular protagonist (Dwayne Johnson).

In 2011, Ellison graduated from Mt. Carmel High School, where he was an active member of the drama club as well as theater productions. He attended Loyola Marymount University. where he obtained a degree in film; despite his initial plans to study physics or engineering.

In 2018, Ellison obtained an FAA license to operate, large camera drones and has been employed by 'Beverly Hills Aerials' since 2019, where he is one of their aerial drone cinematographers, shooting aerial footage for commercials and sports events. Ellison got inspired to make aerial cinematography a career, when helping out his mother's business by capturing aerial footage with his DJI drone.

Filmography

Film

Television

References

External links
 

1993 births
American male child actors
American male film actors
American male television actors
American male voice actors
Living people
20th-century American male actors
21st-century American male actors